Inocybe whitei, or Inocybe pudica, is a species of agaric fungus in the family Cortinariaceae.

Taxonomy
The species was originally defined as Agaricus whitei by Berkeley and Broome in 1876 and transferred to the genus Inocybe by Saccardo in 1887.  The species was also described independently as Inocybe pudica by Robert Kühner in 1947.  Nowadays the two names are considered synonyms, with Berkeley and Broome's name taking precedence.

The epithet whitei was given in honour of Dr. Buchanan White, a naturalist of Perthshire.

Description
The mushroom cap is 2–4 cm wide, conical then convex to flat with an umbo. It has an unpleasant odor. The stalk is 2–6 cm tall and .5–1 cm wide. The spores are brown, elliptical, and smooth.

It is considered poisonous as it contains muscarine.

Similar species
Similar species include Inocybe adaequata, Inocybe fraudans, and Hygrophorus russula.

See also
List of Inocybe species

References

whitei
Fungi described in 1887
Fungi of North America
Poisonous fungi